Carr Mill Mall is a small, local shopping mall located in Carrboro, North Carolina. It is listed on the National Register of Historic Places as the Alberta Mill Complex. It is also a host for numerous local live performances and other cultural events.

History
Built in 1898 by Thomas F. Lloyd, it was formerly a cotton mill known as the Alberta Cotton Mill. By 1913, it had become one of the world's largest hardwood cross-tie makers, shipping them on train tracks adjacent to the mall that continue past Carrboro to the University of North Carolina at Chapel Hill. In 1909, the Julian Carr family bought the mill. In 1913 Carrboro, previously known as West End, was renamed "Venable" in honor of Francis P. Venable, the president of the University of North Carolina at that time. The mill closed by 1930. In 1945, the mill re-opened and remained open until the 1960s.

In 1974, the Carrboro Board of Aldermen voted to have the building torn down to build a shopping mall on the site.  In light of community opposition to the plan, the idea was scrapped, and the mill complex was renovated and reopened as Carr Mill Mall.  The complex now houses numerous restaurants and stores as well as commercial office space on its upper levels. Weaver Street Market, Carrboro's co-op grocery, is one of the primary tenants of the complex and sponsors numerous outdoor events and performances on the lawn in front of Carr Mill Mall.

The song "Freight Train" by Elizabeth 'Libba" Cotten was inspired by the train that ran on the State University Railroad spur past her house on Lloyd St, and which served the needs of Carr Mill. Cotten wrote the song in the early 1900s, as a young teenager.

References

External links
Carr Mill Mall website

Buildings and structures in Chapel Hill-Carrboro, North Carolina
Shopping malls in North Carolina
Shopping malls established in 1977
Industrial buildings and structures on the National Register of Historic Places in North Carolina
Cotton mills in the United States
National Register of Historic Places in Orange County, North Carolina
1977 establishments in North Carolina
Industrial buildings completed in 1898